The 1942 Kansas City Monarchs baseball team represented the Kansas City Monarchs in the Negro American League (NAL) during the 1942 baseball season. The team compiled a 35–17 record, won the NAL pennant, and defeated the Homestead Grays in the 1942 Negro World Series. 

The team featured three players who were later inducted into the Baseball Hall of Fame: center fielder Willard Brown; and pitchers Hilton Smith and Satchel Paige. 

The team's leading batters were:
 Right fielder Ted Strong - .364 batting average, .561 slugging percentage, six home runs, 32 RBIs in 34 games
 Second baseman Bonnie Serrell - .360 batting average, .561 slugging percentage, 22 RBIs in 33 games
 Willard Brown - .338 batting average, .493 slugging percentage, four home runs, 26 RBIs in 35 games

The team's leading pitchers were Jack Matchett (5–1, 1.92 ERA) and Booker McDaniels (5–1, 2.44 ERA).

References

1942 in sports in Missouri
Negro league baseball seasons
Kansas City Monarchs